John Albert Laing (5 July 1884 – 29 October 1944) was an Australian rules footballer who played with University in the Victorian Football League (VFL).

After his football career, Laing became a highly successful engineer and served as president of the Institute of Engineers (Victoria) in 1935.

Sources

Holmesby, Russell & Main, Jim (2007). The Encyclopedia of AFL Footballers. 7th ed. Melbourne: Bas Publishing.

1884 births
University Football Club players
Australian rules footballers from Victoria (Australia)
1944 deaths
People educated at Scotch College, Melbourne